Moritz-Broni Kwarteng (born 28 April 1998) is a German professional footballer who plays as a midfielder for 1. FC Magdeburg.

Career
In May 2018, Kwarteng signed his first professional contract with Hamburger SV, lasting for three years until 30 June 2021. He made his professional debut for Hamburg in the 2. Bundesliga on 10 May 2021, coming on as a substitute in the 82nd minute for David Kinsombi against 1. FC Nürnberg. The home match finished as a 5–2 win for Hamburg.

On 21 January 2022, Kwarteng signed with 1. FC Magdeburg.

Personal life
Kwarteng was born in Stuttgart, Baden-Württemberg and is of Ghanaian descent.

References

External links
 
 
 
 

1998 births
Living people
German sportspeople of Ghanaian descent
Footballers from Stuttgart
German footballers
Association football midfielders
Hamburger SV II players
Hamburger SV players
1. FC Magdeburg players
2. Bundesliga players
3. Liga players
Regionalliga players